The 1924 Penn Quakers football team represented the University of Pennsylvania in the 1924 college football season. The team was finished with a 9–1–1 record and was retroactively named as the 1924 national champion by Parke H. Davis.  They outscored their opponents 203 to 31.

Schedule

References

Penn
Penn Quakers football seasons
College football national champions
Penn Quakers football